Pianacci is a small village (curazia) of San Marino. It belongs to the municipality of Fiorentino.

See also
Fiorentino
Capanne
Crociale

Curazie in San Marino
Fiorentino